The Makedonia Palace is a 5-star hotel located in Downtown Thessaloniki, Greece. The hotel is located on Megalou Alexandrou Avenue, by Thessaloniki's eastern urban waterfront. 

The Makedonia Palace opened in 1972, It has 284 rooms and suites. Located on Thessaloniki's waterfront, it has views to the Thermaic Gulf. It is located a short distance from the city centre, the White Tower of Thessaloniki and the Thessaloniki International Exhibition Centre, where the Thessaloniki International Fair is held every year. Makedonia Palace is about 15 km away from Macedonia International Airport. The hotel is a major venue for both domestic and international congresses and conferences. 

Every September, during the annual opening ceremony of the Thessaloniki International Fair, the Prime Minister of Greece stays at Makedonia Palace along with most of the Cabinet. The hotel has also hosted many Greek and international celebrities, including Russian president Vladimir Putin,XIKI,Chuck Norris, Faye Dunaway, Colin Farrell and Catherine Deneuve, during their stay in the city.

The hotel is owned by the IKA (Greece's social security fund), and was managed by The Daskalantonakis Group. In 2014, Belterra Investments, owned by Ivan Savvidis, leased the hotel through a 30-year contract, at a €1.7 million annual rent.

External links
 Official hotel website

References

Commercial buildings completed in the 20th century
Hotels in Greece
Greek brands
Buildings and structures in Thessaloniki
Hotels established in 1972
Hotel buildings completed in 1972